The geology of Slovakia is structurally complex, with a highly varied array of mountain ranges and belts largely formed during the Paleozoic, Mesozoic and Cenozoic eras.

Stratigraphy, tectonics & geologic history
Most of Slovakia is situated within the West Carpathian orogenic belt, except for the east of the country which is in the East Carpathians. The Transdanubian Mid-Mountain Range occupies a small area in the south, forming the basement rocks of the Danube Basin. The Eastern Alps-Western Carpathian boundary runs through Slovakia.

Outer Western Carpathians

Carpathian Foredeep: Foredeeps formed during the Hercynian orogeny, filled with sedimentary rocks from the Carboniferous through the Oligocene. A Miocene-age nappe, made up of folded Cretaceous and Paleogene sedimentary rocks, known as the Flysch Belt covers most of the foredeep. 
Pieniny Klippen Belt: A narrow 15 kilometer wide highly compressed zone with layers of Jurassic-Lower Cretaceous limestone "klippen" surrounded by more plastic Cretaceous marl. The belt records signs of oblique collision in the Albian, subduction and separation of crystalline rock, nappe stacking in the Campanian and subduction of the Pieniny exotic ridge in the Senonian.

Gemer Belt
Gemericum: Cambrian or Ordovician through Triassic age phyllite, metaquartzite, lydite (black chert) and crystalline limestone partly replaced with siderite belonging to the Gelnica and Radovec Group, five to 10 kilometers thick in the Spissko-gemerske rudoharie Mountains. Also contains marine rocks from the Carboniferous and Permian volcanic rocks.
Meliata Unit: Permian gypsum, Triassic limestone and basic volcanites and Jurassic olistrosomes—sedimentation in a trough with a basement of oceanic crust. This unit shows through as "windows" within the Silica Nappe. 
Borka Nappe: A narrow belt between Slovak Karst and Gemericum with glaucophanitized basic volcanites from the Triassic.
Rudabanyaicum: Slightly metamorphosed small Triassic nappe units extending into Slovakia from Hungary. 
Silica Nappe:  A large nappe, with 1.2 kilometer thick Triassic Wetterstein Limestone. The karst plain of the Slovak Karst are formed within the Silica Nappe. It did originally include Jurassic rocks, but these have mostly eroded away.

Cenozoic (66 million years ago-present)

In the Paleogene, at the beginning of the Cenozoic, a marine transgression flooded the region from the vicinity of the Flysch Belt into the area of the Central West Carpathians. Paleogene sediments are found in the Orava, Liptov, Spiš, Zilina and Podhale depressions. In the Peri Klippen Zone, sedimentation began in the Paleocene, such as the Kambühel Limestone. Conglomerate is common as the bottom strata, overlain by flysch. At the edge of the subducting Flysch Belt, sedimentary rocks are up to four kilometers thick. Central Carpathian rocks are not folded. 

Molasse deposits laid down in the Oligocene span into southern Slovakia from the Pannonian Basin in Hungary. The back-arc molasse formed several large basins, including the Vienna Basin, Danube Basin, South Slovak Basin and East Slovak Basin in the Neogene (the Danuba, South Slovak and East Slovak are all subdivisions of the Pannonian Basin). The basins are filled with the sediments associated with the Paratethys Ocean, up to five kilometers thick. Marl is particularly common, intercalated with sandstone, tuff, conglomerate and algal limestone. Sediments became brackish over time as the Paratethys was isolated from the rest of the world's oceans. Overall, the basins are split up by numerous faults and small grabens, such as the Turiec Basin, Ziar Basin and Orava Basin filled with lake sediments. 

There was limited volcanic activity in the Cenozoic, including a swarm of andesite dikes in the Outer Carpathians. Geophysical research and boreholes have shed light buried volcanic rocks in the southwest Danube Basin and volcanic rocks are found throughout the Central Western Carpathians and eastern Slovakia. 

In the Upper Pliocene, prior to the Quaternary glaciations Slovakia had a subtropical climate akin to Mediterranean climate.

Quaternary
The Quaternary glaciations identified in Slovakia are, from oldest to youngest: Donau, Günz, Mindel, Riss and Würm. During these glaciations glaciers extender downhill from the High Tatras and nonglaciated uplands were subject to frost weathering and solifluction. Deflation of soils is also evident in mountaineous locations.

Peat, eolian wind-blown sands, fluvial sand and gravel and loess are all typical Quaternary sediments, formed in the past 2.5 million years old and dominating the surface of Slovak lowlands. The loess sheets of Slovakia are named, from the lowest to the highest W1, W2 and W3. In between W1 and W2 lies a layer of black-earth soil and between W2 and W3 lies an incipient soil which in parts is gleyed or cryoturbated.

The Váh River has up to seven terraces of sand and gravel. Travertine is also common, including travertine which preserved a cranial mold of a Neanderthal from Gánovce. Moraine formations remain in the high mountains from the Pleistocene glaciations.

Economic geology
The moderately metamorphosed Spišsko-gemerské rudohorie hosts veins of siderite, chalcopyrite and tetrahedrite along with the Veitsch-type magnesite, and the Kremnica-Štiavnica Mountains have polymetallic lead, zinc, copper, gold and silver veins. Permian rocks often hold uranium ore. Salt is found in the Neogene East Slovak Basin and brown coal is extracted from both the Handlová-Nováky Basin and the Modrý Kameň-Potor Basin. There are small deposits of natural gas and oil in the Neogene strata of the Vienna Basin together with older Triassic rocks.

References